The Yukon Plateau is a plateau (also defined as a plain) located in the Yukon Territory, comprising much of the central and southern Yukon Territory and the far northern part of British Columbia, Canada between Tagish Lake (W) and the Cassiar Mountains (E) and north of the Nakina River.

Sub-plateaus include the Teslin Plateau and the Nisutlin Plateau, west and east of Teslin Lake, respectively.

See also
Yukon Interior dry forests
Yukon Ranges

References

Plateaus of Canada
Plateaus of British Columbia
Physiographic sections
Geography of Yukon
Landforms of Yukon
Atlin District